UFC Fight Night: Nelson vs. Story (also known as UFC Fight Night 53) was a mixed martial arts event held on October 4, 2014, at Ericsson Globe Arena in Stockholm, Sweden.

Background
This event was the third event that the UFC hosted in Stockholm, Sweden, following UFC on Fuel TV: Gustafsson vs. Silva which took place in 2012 and UFC on Fuel TV: Mousasi vs. Latifi in 2013.

The event was headlined by a welterweight bout between Gunnar Nelson and Rick Story.

Amir Sadollah was briefly scheduled to face Nico Musoke at the event.  However, Sadollah was pulled from the pairing with Musoke in favor of a bout with Yoshihiro Akiyama on September 20, 2014 at UFC Fight Night 52.  Musoke faced Alexander Yakovlev

Chan Sung Jung was expected to face Akira Corassani at the event.  However, Jung pulled out of the bout citing a strained shoulder and was replaced by Max Holloway.

Robert Whiteford was expected to face Dennis Siver at the event.  However, Whiteford pulled out of the bout and was replaced by promotional newcomer Taylor Lapilus.  In turn, the Swedish Mixed Martial Arts Federation deemed Lapilus an unsuitable opponent and Charles Rosa was chosen to face Siver.

Results

Bonus awards
The following fighters were awarded $50,000 bonuses:

Fight of the Night: Dennis Siver vs. Charles Rosa
Performance of the Night: Mike Wilkinson and Max Holloway

See also

List of UFC events
2014 in UFC

References

UFC Fight Night
Mixed martial arts in Sweden
Sport in Stockholm
2014 in mixed martial arts